Marina Rosenberg (born 1976) is an Israeli diplomat who serves as the Israeli Ambassador to Chile. She was born in Buenos Aires, Argentina, and immigrated to Israel where she was educated at the Hebrew University of Jerusalem and Tel Aviv University. She joined the Ministry of Foreign Affairs in 2006, and served in multiple diplomatic roles before being appointed as the ambassador to Chile.

Early life

Marina Rosenberg was born in 1976, in Buenos Aires, Argentina, and later immigrated to Israel when she was six years old. Rosenberg graduated from the Hebrew University of Jerusalem with a Bachelor of Arts in political science and Latin-American studies, and graduated from Tel Aviv University with a Master of Arts in diplomacy and security studies. She married and had two children with her husband.

Career

Rosenberg joined the Israeli Ministry of Foreign Affairs in 2006, and graduated from the ministry's cadets course in October 2006. From 2009 to 2012, she served as the acting Deputy Director at the UN Specialized Agencies and International Organizations Department. From August 2014 to 2017, Rosenberg served as the Counselor for Foreign Affairs at the Israeli embassy in Berlin. She has also served as the Special Regional Adviser to the Director-General and was responsible for political affairs in the Gulf region at the Director-General's Bureau in Jerusalem.

In July 2019, Rosenberg was appointed to serve as the Israeli Ambassador to Chile.

References

1976 births
Living people
Ambassadors of Israel to Chile
Israeli women ambassadors
Tel Aviv University alumni
Hebrew University of Jerusalem Faculty of Social Sciences alumni
People from Buenos Aires